The 2019 Professional Golf Tour of India, titled as the 2019 Tata Steel Professional Golf Tour of India for sponsorship reasons, was the 13th season of the Professional Golf Tour of India and the first in which Official World Golf Ranking points were awarded.

Schedule
The following table lists official events during the 2019 season.

Order of Merit
The Order of Merit was titled as the Tata Steel PGTI Rankings and was based on prize money won during the season, calculated in Indian rupees.

Notes

References

Professional Golf Tour of India
Professional Golf Tour of India